Linville Falls Tavern, now known as Famous Louise's Rock House Restaurant, is a historic tavern located at Linville Falls, at the tri-point between Burke County, Avery County, and McDowell County, North Carolina. It was built in 1936, and is a 1 1/2-story, eight bay, native stone Rustic Revival-style building.  It has a hipped roof with dormers and two stone chimneys.

It was listed on the National Register of Historic Places in 2000.

References

Commercial buildings on the National Register of Historic Places in North Carolina
Commercial buildings completed in 1936
Buildings and structures in Burke County, North Carolina
Buildings and structures in McDowell County, North Carolina
National Register of Historic Places in Avery County, North Carolina
National Register of Historic Places in Burke County, North Carolina
National Register of Historic Places in McDowell County, North Carolina
U.S. Route 221